Ulmus × brandisiana Melville & Heybroek  is a naturally occurring elm hybrid found across the Kashmir region, arising from the crossing of Ulmus chumlia and the Himalayan elm, Ulmus wallichiana.  The hybrid was formally recognized by Melville and Heybroek after the latter's expedition there in 1960.

Description
The leaves are intermediate in shape between the two parents.

Pests and diseases
Not known.

Cultivation
The tree is not known to have been introduced to the West.

Etymology
The tree is named for Sir Dietrich Brandis, the first Inspector General of Forests appointed to the sub-continent, and author of Indian Trees published in 1906. The name was earlier used by Schneider as the specific name for what was later sunk as a subspecies (xanthoderma) of the Himalayan Elm U. wallichiana. To add to the confusion, specimens of what was later named U. chumlia were treated as U. brandisiana by Augustine Henry.

References

External links

Ulmus hybrids
Ulmus articles missing images
brandisiana
Plant nothospecies